Southern Vietnam Helicopter Company (VNH South), also known as Southern Service Flight Company (SSFC), is a state-owned chartered airline in Vietnam, which provides helicopter flights to various purposes, namely oil platform service, search and rescue operations and cargo freight service. The company is based in Vũng Tàu Airport, Vũng Tàu, Vietnam.

Fleet
Mi-17-1V
Mi-172
S.P L2 MK2
EC130 T2
EC155
EC225
Cabri G2
AW189

References

External links
 Official website of Southern Helicopter Company

Airlines of Vietnam
Helicopter airlines